Anttaj Hawthorne (born November 15, 1981) is a former American football defensive lineman. He was drafted by the Oakland Raiders in the sixth round of the 2005 NFL Draft. He played college football at Wisconsin.

Early years
Hawthorne attended Hamden High School in Hamden, Connecticut, his hometown. He played on the varsity football team all four years of his high school career and was a member of the 2000 New Haven Register All-State football team. He got a scholarship to the University of Wisconsin–Madison.  Anttaj participated in the first ever U.S. Army All-American Bowl game on December 30, 2000.

College career
Hawthorne starred at the University of Wisconsin–Madison for four years.  He was a team leader and a standout player.  Originally a Nose-tackle in his freshman year, later moved to left defensive tackle where he started 41 consecutive games.  Earned third-team All-American honors during his senior year and was also named All-Big Ten Conference three times, including a first-team selection as a junior, and a consensus selection as a senior.  His senior year, he was named team captain and later received the team's Jay Seiler Coaches Appreciation Award.  He finished his college career with a total of 201 tackles, 42 of which for a loss, 12 quarterback sacks, 2 forced fumbles, and 1 interception.  Currently 6th place on Wisconsin–Madison's all-time list with 42 tackles for a loss.

Professional career

Oakland Raiders
Hawthorne drafted by the Oakland Raiders in the sixth round of the 2005 NFL Draft. He spent most of the 2005 season on the Raiders practice squad before finally being signed to the active roster on December 2. He was active for two games his first season, registering two assists in the Raiders regular season finale against the Giants.

In March 2006, he was allocated by the Raiders to the Frankfurt Galaxy of the NFL Europe, where he helped the team win their fourth World Bowl.

Hawthorne appeared in all 16 games for the Raiders in 2006, recording 13 tackles. He was waived by the team on September 1, 2007.

Arizona Rattlers
Hawthorne signed with the Arizona Rattlers of the Arena Football League in 2008, recording nine tackles, a sack and a fumble recovery during his rookie season. On August 10, 2012, Hawthorne and the Rattlers won ArenaBowl XXV over the Philadelphia Soul one year after losing ArenaBowl XXIV to the Jacksonville Sharks. The Rattlers returned to a 3rd straight ArenaBowl in 2013, defeating the Soul once again. On March 9, 2016, Hawthorne was assigned to the Rattlers.

References

External links
Arena Football League bio
Arizona Rattlers bio

1981 births
Living people
Players of American football from New Haven, Connecticut
American football defensive tackles
Wisconsin Badgers football players
Oakland Raiders players
Frankfurt Galaxy players
Arizona Rattlers players